N49 or LMC N49 (PKS 0525-66, PKS B0525-661, PKS J0525-6604, SNR J052559-660453), also known as Brasil Nebula, is the brightest supernova remnant in the Large Magellanic Cloud, approximately 160,000 light-years from Earth. Its form has been assessed to be roughly 5,000 years old.

The latest pictures of N49 by the Chandra X-ray Observatory have revealed a bullet-shaped object traveling at about 5 million miles an hour away from a bright X-ray and gamma-ray point source, probably a neutron star with an extremely powerful magnetic field, known as a soft gamma repeater. A particularly strong gamma-ray burst from LMC N49 was detected on March 5, 1979.

References

 Harvard-Smithsonian Center for Astrophysics, "N49: A supernova remnant in the Large Magellanic Cloud"

Dorado (constellation)
Large Magellanic Cloud
Supernova remnants